Anatoliy Arkadiyovych Maksyuta (born June 15, 1963) is a Ukrainian statesman and former deputy Minister of Economic Development and Trade of Ukraine (since April 5, 2012).

Biography

Early years. Education 
Anatoliy Maksyuta was born in Kozachky (Letychiv Raion, Khmelnytskyi Oblast, Ukrainian SSR).

In 1984 he graduated from the Ternopil Finance and Economics Institute (specialty - "Finance and Credit", qualification "Economist"). In 1994 Anatoliy Maksyuta graduated from the Institute of Public Administration and Local Self-Government under the Cabinet of Ukraine (specialty "State Government", qualification "Master of Public Administration").

Career

Activities in local self-government 
1984–1984: senior economist (Finance Department of Executive Committee of Cherniakhiv Raion Council of People's Deputies, Zhytomyr oblast).
1984–1986: served in the Soviet Army.
1986–1987: economist, deputy chairman - chairman of Inspection of government revenue (Finance Department of Executive Committee of Cherniakhiv Raion Council of People's Deputies, Zhytomyr oblast).
1987–1988: chairman of the department of comprehensive economic and social development (Executive Committee of Cherniakhiv Raion Council of People's Deputies, Zhytomyr oblast).
1988–1990: chairman of the financial department of the (Executive Committee of Luhyny Raion Council of People's Deputies, Zhytomyr oblast).
1990–1993: deputy chairman of the Budget Division of Financial Management (Executive Committee of Zhytomyr Oblast Council of People's Deputies).
1993–1993: deputy chairman - chairman of Finance of the local economy, money and securities financial management (Executive Committee of Zhytomyr Oblast Council of People's Deputies).

Government activities 
1993–1994: student of the Institute of Public Administration and Local Self-Government under the Cabinet of Ukraine.
1994–1995: deputy chairman of General Budget Department - chairman of regional budgets section.
1995–1996: chairman of General Budget Department, a member of the Ministry of Finance of Ukraine board.
1996–1997: first deputy chairman of the General Budget Department (Ministry of Finance of Ukraine).
1997–2000: chairman of General Budget Department (Ministry of Finance of Ukraine).
2000–2001: chairman of the Department of Budget (Ministry of Finance of Ukraine).
2001–2002: deputy State Secretary (Ministry of Finance of Ukraine).
2002–2003: State Secretary (Ministry of Finance of Ukraine).
2003–2003: deputy State Secretary (Ministry of Finance of Ukraine).
2003–2005: advisor of the President of Ukraine.
2005–2005: deputy Minister of Finance of Ukraine.
2005–2007, 2008–2011: first deputy Minister of Economy of Ukraine.
2011–2012: advisor of the President of Ukraine - chairman of the Department of social area reforming in Presidential Administration of Ukraine.
Since April 5, 2012 - first Deputy Minister of Economic Development and Trade of Ukraine.
Since September 27, 2012 - chairman of the Scientific and Technical Council of the Ministry of Economic Development and Trade of Ukraine.
Since January 30, 2013 - coordinator from Ukraine in the implementation of the EU Strategy for the Danube Region.
On 16 October 2014 he was dismissed as Deputy Minister of Economic Development and Trade.

State awards 
Honor Diploma of the Cabinet of Ukraine (1999).
Merited Economist of Ukraine (2008).

References

External links 
Official biography on the website of the Ministry of Economic Development and Trade (Ukraine)
The text of the Decree of the President of Ukraine № 245/2012 "On appointment Balabushko First Deputy Minister of Economic Development and Trade of Ukraine"
Note: Maksyuta Anatoliy Arkadiyovych

Ministry of Economic Development, Trade and Agriculture
21st-century Ukrainian economists
1963 births
Living people
People from Khmelnytskyi Oblast
Economic development and trade ministers of Ukraine
20th-century Ukrainian economists